Maria Eilberg is a British dressage rider. She won team silver with the British team at the European Championships in Windsor 2009 and at the World Equestrian Games in Lexington KY in 2010 with her horse Two Sox. She was also the first reserve for the British team at the 2008 Olympic Games and for the 2006 FEI World Equestrian Games.

Her brother Michael Eilberg is also a successful dressage rider for Great Britain. He won team silver at the European Championships in 2013 and at the 2014 FEI World Equestrian Games. Maria's father Ferdi is a renowned dressage trainer and silver medal winner at the 1993 European Championships.

References 

Living people
1984 births
Female equestrians
British female equestrians
British dressage riders